Behr Paint Company (stylized as BEHR) is a supplier of architectural paint and exterior wood care products to the United States and Canadian do-it-yourself markets. BEHR manufactures interior and exterior house paints, decorative finishes, primers, stains and surface preparation products sold exclusively at The Home Depot.

Behr was founded in 1947 when Otho Behr, Jr. sold linseed oil wood stains to paint stores from the back of his station wagon. Behr approached his father, a chemist, to develop a formula for a redwood stain. The resulting growth of the business led Behr to move the company's operations to an 800 square foot Quonset hut in Pasadena, California in 1948. The business outgrew this facility as well, and in the early 1950s Behr relocated the company to its current home in Santa Ana, California. Behr has grown as the home resale market created greater demand for paints, lighting, wallpaper and other goods.

In 1988, Behr offered computer color matching, allowing customers to bring pieces of fabric or other color samples to The Home Depot to be scanned by a color matching machine and be turned into a color formula for paint. In 1999, Behr was purchased by the Masco Corporation.

References

External links
 Official website
 

Chemical companies established in 1947
Paint and coatings companies of the United States
Companies based in Santa Ana, California
1947 establishments in California
The Home Depot